...And the Women Who Love Them is an EP by the Berkeley, California punk rock band The Mr. T Experience, released in 1994 by Lookout! Records. It was the band's first release with drummer Jim "Jym" Pittman, replacing founding member Alex Laipeneiks who had left the group the previous year. It was recorded at a time when the band were very near breaking up permanently, and its release helped to creatively rejuvenate the group. Shortly after its release bassist Aaron Rubin left the band and was placed by Joel Reader.

In 2002 ...And the Women Who Love Them was re-released as a "Special Addition" CD which includes numerous bonus tracks compiling nearly all of the band's singles, outtakes, and rare tracks from 1994 through 1997, as well as detailed liner notes explaining this span of the band's history and the recording of the songs.

Track listing

Performers
Dr. Frank – Vocals, guitar
Aaron Rubin – bass (tracks 1-8)
Joel Reader – bass (tracks 8-25)
Jim "Jym" Pittman – drums

Album information
Produced by Kevin Army
Mastered by John Golden at John Golden Mastering
Artwork by Chris Appelgren

References

The Mr. T Experience EPs
1994 EPs
Lookout! Records EPs